George Thomas Taylor (23 April 1907–1951) was an English footballer who played in the Football League for Bolton Wanderers, Coventry City and Notts County.

References

1907 births
1951 deaths
English footballers
Association football forwards
English Football League players
Walsall Wood F.C. players
Stourbridge F.C. players
Notts County F.C. players
Bolton Wanderers F.C. players
Coventry City F.C. players